Aschan is a surname. Notable people with the surname include: 

Carl Aschan (1906–2008), Swedish-born British intelligence officer and spy during World War II
Lisa Aschan (born 1978), Swedish film director and screenwriter
Ossian Aschan (1860–1939), Finnish chemist and politician